Dongpo District (  is a district of the city of Meishan, Sichuan Province, China. It is named after the Song Dynasty scholar and poet Su Dongpo, who was born there.

Districts of Sichuan
Meishan